Thrane as a surname of Danish origin may refer to people:

Josephine Thrane (1820–1862), Norwegian teacher and political activist
Marcus Thrane (1817–1890), Norwegian author, journalist, and the leader of the first Norwegian labor movement
Mathias Thrane (born 1993), Danish football player
Morten Thrane Brünnich (1737–1827), Danish zoologist and mineralogist
Morten Thrane Esmark (1801–1882), Norwegian priest and mineralogist
Rasmus Thrane Hansen (born 1990), Danish orienteer
Waldemar Thrane (1790–1828), Norwegian composer, violinist and conductor

See also
 Thrane & Thrane a Danish Satellite Communications Company

Danish-language surnames